Rhyssemus inscitus, is a species of dung beetle widespread throughout Afro-Oriental regions, Indochinese regions and Australia.

Distribution
The species is found in Madagascar, India. Sri Lanka, Indonesia, Laos, Myanmar, Nepal, South China, Japan, Thailand, Philippines, Vietnam, Papua New Guinea and Australia.

References 

Scarabaeidae
Insects of Sri Lanka
Insects of India
Insects described in 1858